Schleswig (South Jutlandic: Sljasvig) is a town in the northeastern part of Schleswig-Holstein, Germany. It is the capital of the Kreis (district) Schleswig-Flensburg. It has a population of about 27,000, the main industries being leather and food processing. It takes its name from the Schlei, an inlet of the Baltic sea at the end of which it sits, and vik or vig which means "bay" in Old Norse and Danish. Schleswig or Slesvig therefore means "bay of the Schlei".

History

The Viking settlement of Hedeby, located south of the modern town, was first mentioned in 804. It was a powerful settlement in the Baltic region, dominating the area for more than 200 years. In 1050, following several destructions, the population was moved to the opposite shore of the Schlei, becoming the city of Schleswig. In 1066 Hedeby was finally destroyed, and Schleswig remained as a part of the Danish kingdom.

In 1544, Gottorf Castle became the residence of the local rulers. The dukes of Gottorf were vassals of the Danish kings and ruled over much of present-day Schleswig-Holstein. In 1721, when the Great Northern War ended, the dukes of Gottorf lost their power and their land became Danish crown land. After the Second Schleswig War (1864), Schleswig was annexed by the Kingdom of Prussia.

Geography

Schleswig lies at the western end of the Schlei Förde, which separates the two peninsulas of Angeln and Schwansen, and is on the western edge of the Schleswig-Holstein Uplands on the transition to the Geest country. Brautsee (lake) is in the town.

The nearest major cities are Flensburg, Husum and Kiel. Autobahn 7 runs immediately west of the city. Highways 76 and 77 end in Schleswig and B 201 runs to the north of the town. Schleswig station is a stop for InterCity and Intercity-Express trains and is on the Hamburg–Neumünster–Flensburg and Husum–Kiel lines.

Climate
The climate is oceanic (Köppen: Cfb), humid and mild with a slight continental influence. The annual mean temperature is 8 °C and precipitation averages 925 mm.

Sights

Schleswig Cathedral (1134), with the tomb of King Frederick I of Denmark
Gottorf Castle (built 1161), former residence of the dukes, with the baroque Neuwerk garden, containing a replica of the Globe of Gottorf
Holm: old fishing village at the Schlei shore
Hedeby, Viking settlement

Twin towns – sister cities

Schleswig is twinned with:
 Hillingdon, England, United Kingdom
 Mantes-la-Jolie, France
 Vejle, Denmark
 Waren, Germany

Notable people

Valdemar I of Denmark (1131–1182), King of Denmark from 1154 until his death in 1182.
Christian III of Denmark (1503–1559), King of Denmark 
Adolf Frederick, King of Sweden (1710–1771), King of Sweden 
Frederick August I, Duke of Oldenburg (1711–1785), nobleman
Asmus Jacob Carstens (1754–1798) a Danish-German painter, committed to German Neoclassicism.
Princess Louise Caroline of Hesse-Kassel (1789–1867), matriarch of the House of Schleswig-Holstein-Sonderburg-Glücksburg
Herman Wilhelm Bissen (1798–1868), Danish sculptor
Friedrich Bernhard Westphal (1803–1844), German-Danish genre painter and illustrator
Karl Friedrich Wilhelm Jessen (1821–1889), botanist
Frederick VIII, Duke of Schleswig-Holstein (1821–1889), patriarch of the House of Schleswig-Holstein-Sonderburg-Augustenburg
Friedrich Krichauff (1824–1904), politician in colonial South Australia
Victor Hensen (1835–1924), zoologist
Ove H. Berg (1840–1922), American politician and businessman, emigrated to the US in 1881
Julius Friedrich Theodor Engel (1842–1926), judge and politician
Hans von Seeckt (1866–1936), military officer
Ulrich von Brockdorff-Rantzau (1869–1928), politician and diplomat, first Foreign Minister of the Weimar Republic
Christian Hansen (1885–1972), general
Hermann-Bernhard Ramcke (1889–1968), General of paratroop forces
Bernhard Rogge (1899–1982), naval officer 
Bernd Kröplin (1944–2019), engineer and academic
Ralf Rothmann (born 1953), novelist
Thomas Heberer (born 1965), musician and composer
Ekkehard Wölk (born 1967), pianist, arranger and composer

Sport 
Jobst Hirscht (born 1948), athlete who competed mainly in the 100 metres
Hole Rößler (born 1949), modern pentathlete
Jan-Ingwer Callsen-Bracker (born 1984), footballer

References

External links

Official website 

 
Towns in Schleswig-Holstein
Schleswig-Flensburg